The 2021–22 Telenet UCI Cyclo-cross World Cup was a season-long cyclo-cross competition, organized by the Union Cycliste Internationale (UCI). The UCI Cyclo-cross World Cup took place between 10 October 2021 and 23 January 2022. This season the number of races was expanded to 16, whereas in regular seasons most recently only about 9 were organized. The intention was to already expand to 14 races during the 2020–21 season, but as a result of the COVID-19 pandemic, the previous season was reduced to five races only.

The defending champions were Wout van Aert in the men's competition and Lucinda Brand in the women's competition.

Points distribution
Points were awarded to all eligible riders at each race. From this season, the points awarded are according to the same scale for all categories, but only the top 25 riders receive points rather than the top 50. The top ten finishers received points according to the following table:

 Riders finishing in positions 11 to 25 also received points, going down from 15 points for 11th place by one point per place to 1 point for 25th place.
 Note that the points given here are entirely different from the UCI ranking points, which are distributed according to a different scale and determine starting order in races, but have no impact on World Cup standings.

Events
Fourteen races were supposed to be held last season, but eventually, only five were held. These five are also included this season but the calendar is expanded further to sixteen races, with last season's cancelled races in Antwerp, Besançon, Hoogerheide, Koksijde, Waterloo and Zonhoven returning to the calendar, as well as the race in Iowa which last featured in the 2019–20 season. Entirely new will be the races in Fayetteville (United States), Flamanville (France), Rucphen (Netherlands) and Val di Sole (Italy).

Due to the Covid-19 pandemic the race in Antwerp was annulled.

Points standings

Elite men

Elite women

U23 men

Junior men

Junior women

References

Sources

External links

World Cup
World Cup
UCI Cyclo-cross World Cup